Spidia miserrima is a moth in the family Drepanidae. It was described by William Jacob Holland in 1893. It is found in Gabon.

The length of the forewings is about 25 mm. Adults are similar to Spidia excentrica and Spidia planola.

References

Endemic fauna of Gabon
Moths described in 1893
Drepaninae